Rüdesheim (Rhein) station is in the town of Rüdesheim am Rhein in the German state of Hesse on the East Rhine Railway. It is on the western edge of the town, separated from the Rhine only by federal highway B 42. The entrance building is a double storey stucco building in a neoclassical style. It is now one of the cultural monuments listed in the UNESCO World Heritage Site of the Upper Middle Rhine Valley. The station is classified by Deutsche Bahn as a category 5 station.

History

Construction
The station was designed by the architect Heinrich Velde of Diez and built in the years 1854–1856, and was opened on 11 August 1856 as the first terminus of the Nassau Rhine Railway (Nassauische Rheinbahn) from Wiesbaden to Rüdesheim. On 22 February 1862, the line was extended to Oberlahnstein and it became a through station.

The entrance building is built in a single style that was prevalent at the time with the entrance hall and function rooms on the ground floor and the stationmaster's accommodation on the first floor above. The stucco facade with a simple series of windows is built in the style of neoclassical architecture that was used for Prussian government buildings. Apart from Rüdesheim, the only buildings built purely in form of this architecture left in the Middle Rhine Valley are at the stations of Oberwesel and Bacharach on the West Rhine Railway.

Current  situation
In 2002, the very rundown station buildings were acquired by the Heil brothers of Rüdesheim and completely renovated and refurbished. In addition to the entrance building, the complex includes a freight shed and an office building, all of which are heritage listed. In 2007, its private owners were given a Hessian heritage prize for its exemplary restoration. The station has been restored as the representative entrance building in the city of Rüdesheim, as it was originally built.

Rail services

Regional
Rüdesheim (Rhein) station is served by the Regionalbahn service RB 10 (RheingauLinie) of the Rhein-Main-Verkehrsverbund (Rhine-Main Transport Association, RMV) operated hourly and, during peak hours, every half-hour.

Long-distance
The station has not normally been served by long-distance railway services for years. Only during construction work or other obstruction of the West Rhine Railway have diverted long-distance trains stopped here. The only exception was that in 2012, Rüdesheim station was served by one long-distance service from 9 September to 21 October. This is also the only service that runs only on the east-bank line and not via Koblenz Hauptbahnhof.

Notes

References

External links

 
 

Railway stations in Hesse
Rheingau-Taunus-Kreis
Railway stations in Germany opened in 1856